A district in New Zealand is a territorial authority area governed by a district council as a second-tier of local government in New Zealand, below regional councils. They were formed as a result of the local government reforms in 1989. There are 53 districts in New Zealand, and they do not include the 12 city councils, the Auckland Council, and the Chatham Islands Council. District councils serve a combination of rural and urban communities, while city councils administer the larger urban areas. Three districts (Gisborne, Tasman, and Marlborough) are unitary authorities also performing the functions of a regional council.

Districts are not subdivisions of regions, and some of them fall within more than one region. Taupō District has the distinction of straddling the boundaries of four different regions. Regional council areas are based on water catchment areas, whereas district council areas are based on community of interest and road access. Regional councils are responsible for the administration of many environmental and public transport matters, while the district councils administer local roads and reserves, sewerage, building consents, the land use and subdivision aspects of resource management, and other local matters. Some activities are delegated to council-controlled organisations.

Districts
There are currently 53 districts in New Zealand.

North Island (34)
The North Island comprises 34 districts.

Northland Region (3)
Far North District
Kaipara District
Whangarei District

Waikato Region (7)
Hauraki District
Matamata-Piako District
Ōtorohanga District
South Waikato District
Thames-Coromandel District
Waikato District
Waipa District

Bay of Plenty Region (4)
Kawerau District
Ōpōtiki District
Western Bay of Plenty District
Whakatāne District

Hawke's Bay Region (3)
Central Hawke's Bay District
Hastings District
Wairoa District

Taranaki Region (2)
New Plymouth District
South Taranaki District

Manawatū-Whanganui Region (4)
Horowhenua District
Manawatū District
Ruapehu District
Whanganui District

Wellington Region (4)
Carterton District
Kapiti Coast District
Masterton District
South Wairarapa District

Transregional districts (6)
Rangitikei District (Manawatū-Whanganui: 86.37%; Hawke's Bay: 13.63%)
Rotorua Lakes District (Bay of Plenty: 61.52%; Waikato: 38.48%)
Stratford District (Taranaki: 68.13%; Manawatū-Whanganui: 31.87%)
Tararua District (Manawatū-Whanganui: 98.42%; Wellington: 1.58%)
Taupō District (Waikato: 73.74%; Bay of Plenty: 14.31%; Hawke's Bay: 11.26%; Manawatū-Whanganui: 0.69%)
Waitomo District (Waikato: 94.87%; Manawatū-Whanganui: 5.13%)

Unitary authority (1)
Gisborne District

South Island (19)
The South Island and Stewart Island comprise 19 districts.

West Coast Region (3)
Buller District
Grey District
Westland District

Canterbury Region (8)
Ashburton District
Hurunui District
Kaikōura District
Mackenzie District
Selwyn District
Timaru District
Waimakariri District
Waimate District

Otago Region (3)
Central Otago District
Clutha District
Queenstown-Lakes District

Southland Region (2)
Gore District
Southland District

Transregional district (1)
Waitaki District (Canterbury: 59.61%; Otago: 40.39%)

Unitary authorities (2)
Marlborough District
Tasman District

Notes:

Kaikōura District was transferred from the Nelson-Marlborough Region to the Canterbury Region in 1992.
The Banks Peninsula District became a part of Christchurch as a result of 2005 referendum.
Franklin District, Papakura District, and Rodney District no longer exist as of 2010. They became part of other districts and the Auckland Region.

See also
Community board
Politics of New Zealand
Territorial authorities of New Zealand
List of former territorial authorities in New Zealand

References

External links
Regional and district boundaries (North Island)
Regional and district boundaries (South Island)
District councils in New Zealand

 
Districts, New Zealand